Qarahta, is a Syrian village located in Markaz Rif Dimashq, Douma District. According to the Syria Central Bureau of Statistics (CBS), Qarahta had a population of 1,951 in the 2004 census.

References

Populated places in Douma District